Charlotte Mary Wilson (6 May 1854, Kemerton, Worcestershire – 28 April 1944, Irvington-on-Hudson, New York) was an English Fabian and anarchist who co-founded Freedom newspaper in 1886 with Peter Kropotkin, and edited, published, and largely financed it during its first decade.  She remained editor of Freedom until 1895.

Life and work
Born Charlotte Mary Martin, she was the daughter of a well-to-do physician, Robert Spencer Martin.  She was educated at Newnham College, Cambridge. She married Arthur Wilson, a stockbroker, and the couple moved to London. Charlotte Wilson joined the Fabian Society in 1884 and soon joined its Executive Committee.

At the same time she founded an informal political study group for 'advanced' thinkers, known as the Hampstead Historic Club (also known as the Karl Marx Society or The Proudhon Society). This met in her former early 17th century farmhouse, called Wyldes, on the edge of Hampstead Heath. No records of the club survive but there are references to it in the memoirs of several of those who attended. In her history of Wyldes Mrs Wilson records the names of some of those who visited the house, most of whom are known to have been present at Club meetings. They included Sidney Webb, George Bernard Shaw, Sydney Olivier, Annie Besant, Graham Wallas, Belfort Bax, Edward Pease, E. Nesbit, Hubert Bland, Karl Pearson, Havelock Ellis, Edward Carpenter, Frank Podmore, Ford Madox Brown, and Olive Schreiner among others. The secretary was Emma Brooke.

The Club first turned its attention to studying Das Kapital read out by a Russian woman in French, and later turned to Proudhon. In 1889 George Bernard Shaw described the Club discussions and how heated they became. Although the Fabian Society and Hampstead Historic Club contained many of the same people, they remained separate. The ideas debated by the Club resulted in the publication of Fabian Essays in Socialism in 1889. This led Shaw to describe Hampstead, and the meetings, as 'the birthplace of middleclass socialism.'

Another visitor to the house was Stepniak who, with Mrs Wilson, Karl Pearson and Wilfrid Voynich, established an informal society that was later formalised as The Society of Friends of Russian Freedom. Mrs Wilson is believed to be the model for Gemma in the best-selling novel The Gadfly by Ethel Voynich; while a description of Mrs Wilson's faux farm kitchen where the Club met was given by E. Nesbit.

An active campaigner she spoke at socialist rallies, including that in Trafalgar Square on 13 November 1887, known as Bloody Sunday, which police broke up violently.

In 1886, parliamentarians within the Fabian Society proposed that it organize as a political party; William Morris and Wilson opposed the motion, but were defeated. She subsequently resigned from the Society in April 1887, continuing her association with the anarchists from the Society.

She wrote extensively to Karl Pearson about Anarchism, the Fabians, the Karl Marx Society and about her "Russian Society" from 1884 to 1896.

In 1886, Wilson and Kropotkin co-founded Freedom, an anarchist newspaper that shared William Morris's press with which he printed Commonweal; Wilson remained its editor until 1895. The newspaper's mission statement is stated in every issue, on page 2, and summarises the writers' view of anarchism.

Her publication Work (1888) was mistakenly attributed to Kropotkin for many years.

In 2000 Freedom Press released a book consisting of a collection of her essays, edited by Nicolas Walter.

Although never disavowing the Anarchist ideology she distanced herself from the movement in the early years of the twentieth century. She rejoined the Fabian Society in 1907, and founded its Women's Group in 1908 joining the campaign for female suffrage. She remained a very prominent member of the Fabian Women's Group in its early years as she served as its General Secretary (1908–1913) and Secretary of the Studies Subcommittee (1908–1913) where she heavily influenced the direction of the group's studies into working conditions for women. She would also rejoin the Fabian Executive between 1911 and 1914.

Citations

References 
Charlotte Wilson, Nicholas Walter (Ed.) (2000). Anarchist Essays. Freedom Press. 
John Quail (1978). The Slow Burning Fuse: The Lost History of the British Anarchists. Flamingo. 
Parish Records, Kemerton, Gloucestershire.
Edward R.Pease (1916). "The History of the Fabian Society". A.C.Fifield.

External links

A History of Freedom Press
Charlotte Wilson: Edited Works, Organized by Work
Charlotte Wilson: Edited Works, Organized by Date

1854 births
1944 deaths
19th-century English non-fiction writers
19th-century English women writers
20th-century English non-fiction writers
20th-century English women writers
Alumni of Newnham College, Cambridge
Anarchist writers
Anarcha-feminists
Anarcho-communists
Communist women writers
English anarchists
English feminists
English newspaper editors
English socialists
English women non-fiction writers
Libertarian socialists
Members of the Fabian Society
People from Wychavon (district)
English socialist feminists
Women newspaper editors